David Roger "Steaky" Adams (January 14, 1920 – November 21, 2011) was a Canadian football player who played for the Calgary Stampeders. He won the Grey Cup with them in 1948. Adams was also selected for the all-star team in 1946 and 1947. Previously, Adams served in World War II with the Royal Canadian Engineers. He died in 2011.

References

1920 births
2011 deaths
Calgary Stampeders players
Canadian Army personnel of World War II
Royal Canadian Engineers soldiers
Canadian military personnel from Alberta